Czech Connect Airlines was an airline based in Ostrava, Czech Republic. Its main base was Brno-Tuřany Airport.

History 
Czech Connect Airlines operated scheduled flights to Russia and CIS; and charter flights for travel agencies to various popular summer destinations. Selected flights also offered available tickets for individual travellers.

In January 2012, the company announced bankruptcy and stopped its activities.

Destinations 

 Czech Republic
Brno – Brno-Tuřany Airport
Karlovy Vary – Karlovy Vary Airport
Pardubice – Pardubice Airport
Prague – Prague Ruzyně Airport
 Russia
Moscow – Domodedovo International Airport
Rostov-on-Don – Rostov-on-Don Airport
St. Petersburg – Pulkovo Airport
Yekaterinburg – Koltsovo Airport
 Switzerland
Geneva – Geneva International Airport

Fleet 
The Czech Connect Airlines fleet includes the following aircraft:

References

External links 

Defunct airlines of the Czech Republic
Airlines established in 2011
Airlines disestablished in 2012
Czech companies established in 2011